Antal Újváry (March 16, 1907 – 1967) was a Hungarian field handball player who competed in the 1936 Summer Olympics. He was part of the Hungarian field handball team, which finished fourth in the Olympic tournament. He played three matches as goalkeeper.

References

1907 births
1967 deaths
Hungarian male handball players
Olympic handball players of Hungary
Field handball players at the 1936 Summer Olympics